In mountaineering, a false peak or false summit is a peak that appears to be the pinnacle of the mountain but upon reaching, it turns out the summit is higher. False peaks can have significant and discouraging effects on climbers' psychological states by inducing feelings of lost hope or even failure. The term false peak can also be applied idiomatically to non-mountaineering activities where obstacles posing as the end goal produce the same psychological effects.

References 

Mountaineering